Frozen Embers is an EP released in 2003 by The Crüxshadows. It contains tracks from the subsequent full length release, Ethernaut, remixes of tracks from Wishfire, and new tracks. The EP peaked at #2 on the German Alternative Charts (DAC) and ranked #24 on the DAC Top 100 Singles chart for 2003.

Track listing
 "Winter Born (This Sacrifice)" (album version)
 "Dance Floor Metaphor"
 "Return (Coming Home)" (Dreamside Remix Part I)
 "Return (Coming Home)" (Dreamside Remix Part II)
 "Seraphs" (Revox Lost Souls Mix)
 "Winter Born (This Sacrifice)" (Club/Radio Edit)
 "Go Away" (Future Bible Heroes Remix)
 "Sinking"
 "Return (Coming Home)" (Assemblage23 Remix)
 "Winter Born (This Sacrifice)" (Sacrificial Acoustic Version)
 "Return (Coming Home)" (Tenebrous Remix)
 "Return (Coming Home)" (DJ Ian Fford 555 Remix)
 "Deception" (Original English version)

Credits 
 Cover Art - Rogue
 Graphic Design - Melissa
 Flute, Other [Opinions] - Jessica Lackey
 Guitar, Backing Vocals - Stacey Campbell
 Keyboards - Chris Brantley
 Keyboards, Violin, Cello - Rachel McDonnell
 Photography - Monaco
 Technician - Trevor Brown
 Vocals, Programmed By, Technician [Sequences] – Rogue
 Written-By - Rogue, The Crüxshadows

References

The Crüxshadows EPs
2003 EPs
2003 remix albums
Remix EPs